Bram Zanella (born 27 September 1918) was a Venezuelan sports shooter. He competed in the trap event at the 1960 Summer Olympics.

References

External links

1918 births
Possibly living people
Venezuelan male sport shooters
Olympic shooters of Venezuela
Shooters at the 1960 Summer Olympics